INS Kamorta is the first of four anti-submarine Kamorta-class stealth corvettes which has been built for the Indian Navy.

It is a significant step towards India's pursuit for self-reliance in indigenous warship building, bringing closer home Indian Navy's quest to be a true Blue-Water Navy with ships and submarines designed and built within the country. She was designed and manufactured by GRSE, launched on 19 April 2010, as part of Project 28, approved in 2003. It was named after Kamorta island in Andaman and Nicobar, India .

Design and Description
Kamorta was originally expected to be built using high-tensile imported steel. But as the was built INS Shivalik, high-grade steel produced in India was utilized for its construction. She has enhanced stealth features such as an X Form Hull and inclined sides for low Radar cross-section, Infra-red suppression, and Acoustic quieting systems. She is the first Indian Navy ship to be built with carbon fiber reinforced plastic which reduces weight and life cycle maintenance costs. The hull of the ship encompassed the bulk of sensors and weapon systems that were also indigenously manufactured by various Indian industries.

It is the first indigenous anti-submarine corvette as well as the first indigenous stealth corvette built by India. About 90% of the ship is indigenous and the ship is capable of fighting in NBC conditions. It is equipped with a rail-less helo traversing system which is used for handling a helicopter. It also features a foldable hangar door.

General characteristics and propulsion
It is powered by four  diesel engines at 1,050 rpm

As in INS Shivalik, high-grade steel produced in India was utilized for its construction. She was delivered to Navy on 12 July 2014. She is the first indigenous anti-submarine corvette as well as the first indigenous stealth corvette built by India.  Union minister of defense, Arun Jaitley commissioned the ship on 23 August 2014.

Armament 
Kamorta is equipped with a wide range of weapon systems. It is fitted with an OTO Melara 76 mm main gun, and uses two AK-630 guns and provision for 16-cell VLS launched Barak 1 missiles as close-in weapon system, which will be added later. In addition, 2 RBU-6000 anti-submarine rocket launchers and torpedo tubes capable of firing heavy weight torpedoes.

The sensors of this warship include the advanced bow mounted sonar and the indigenous 3D-CAR air-surveillance radar Revathi with capability to detect targets exceeding . It is also the first warship to be equipped with the Kavach decoy system for protection against anti-ship missiles. Like INS Kolkata, this warship is also commissioned without the critical medium-range  surface-to-air missile (SAM) and advanced light towed array sonars (ALTAS), which is planned to be added later.

Commissioning 
Kamorta was ordered in 2003 and was launched on 21 April 2010.  It was expected to join the fleet in October 2012 but was handed over to the Navy on 12 July 2014.

On 12 July, the front line warship was formally handed over by GRSE chairman and managing director Rear Admiral A. K. Verma (Ret'd.) to the Navy at a ceremony in GRSE's fitting-out jetty She was commissioned into the Navy on 23 August 2014, with Cdr. Manoj Jha as her first captain.

A minor fire broke out on 1 February 2017 in the left engine room of the ship when it was operating at sea. The room was immediately evacuated and the fire put out using the ship's Fixed fire system and there were no injuries during the incident.

Gallery

References

External links

Corvettes of the Indian Navy
Kamorta-class corvettes
2010 ships
Ships built in India